Banabar may refer to:
 Banabar, Khalajastan, Qom